The 1998 Florida State Seminoles football team represented Florida State University in the 1998 NCAA Division I-A football season. The team was coached by Bobby Bowden and played their home games at Doak Campbell Stadium.

The Seminoles were the runner up in the first BCS Championship game at the Fiesta Bowl against the Tennessee Volunteers.

Schedule

Rankings

References

Florida State
Florida State Seminoles football seasons
Atlantic Coast Conference football champion seasons
Florida State Seminoles football